State Highway 321 (SH 321)  is a north–south highway in southeastern Texas, starting at US 90 in Dayton and ending at Loop 573 in Cleveland. The route was designated on October 30, 1939.

In Cleveland, SH 321 is also known as Houston Street, providing the main street for downtown Cleveland. It is a two lane urban highway with a left turn lane as it travels throughout Cleveland, until roughly 3/4 of a mile northeast of the city limit. From Loop 573, on southward until junction with SH 105, SH 321 is also known as SH 105. In the city of Dayton, it is referred to as North Cleveland Street, passing through residential Dayton as a 4-lane urban highway, before narrowing back down to a 2-lane rural State Highway.

SH 321 is part of the eastern Greater Houston area evacuation route, providing a corridor for communities such as Baytown, Kemah, and Pasadena.

History
Based on Handbook of Texas article about Tarkington Prairie, SH 321 is believed to cover part of the Nacogdoches-Lynchburg trail, being the Old Wells store (as it is referred to on the historical marker) sits along the trail, and SH 321 runs directly in front of the building.

Historical markers

Route Description 

The southern terminus of SH 321 is at US 90 near downtown Dayton. As its travels north, it carries the street name North Cleveland Street, immediately north of US 90 is the Union Pacific Lafayette subdivision, which SH 321 crosses by an underpass under the railroad right of way. FM 1960 terminates at the next intersection, as well as is the southern terminus of FM 1008. SH 321 continues northward through the neighborhoods of Dayton as a 4-lane highway, eventually changing to a 2-lane rural road, then has 2 directional overpasses over the Union Pacific Beaumont subdivision rail line. The eastern terminus of FM 686 occurs just inside the northern edge of Dayton city limit. To the west of SH 321 is 3 Texas Department of Criminal Justice units; Plane State Jail, Henley State Jail, and the Hightower Unit. The road continues north through rural Liberty County and meets again with the northern terminus of FM 1008. Continuing north SH 321 passes FM 163, and a mile later becomes a concurrent route with SH 105. As it joins SH 105, the route turns west then northwest as it approaches the city of Cleveland, where is it known as Houston Street. Just inside of the Cleveland City limit, Business SH 105 cuts south around the city. As SH 321 nears the terminus, the route passes FM 787 and FM 1010. One block before the terminus in downtown Cleveland the route crosses Union Pacific Rabbit line. SH 321 then reaches its terminus at Loop 573, while SH 105 turns south and become concurrent with Loop 573.

Ghost towns

Future
The Houston-Galveston Area Council long term plans (by 2025) show plans to expand SH 321 to an urban four lane divided highway with left turn lane, south out of Cleveland until SH 105 cuts east (6–8 miles south of Cleveland).

Junction list

References

Sources
Ghost towns
Handbook of Texas Online, s.v. "," http://www.tshaonline.org/handbook/online/articles/hvm39 (accessed December 24, 2006).
Handbook of Texas Online, s.v. "," http://www.tshaonline.org/handbook/online/articles/hvlac (accessed December 24, 2006).
Historical markers
Handbook of Texas Online, s.v. "," http://www.tshaonline.org/handbook/online/articles/hrt04 (accessed December 24, 2006).
https://web.archive.org/web/20110707072243/http://www.9key.com/markers/marker_detail.asp?atlas_number=5291009692
https://web.archive.org/web/20110707072246/http://www.9key.com/markers/marker_detail.asp?atlas_number=5291009689

321
Transportation in Liberty County, Texas